Carlo Oppizzoni, spelled also Opizzoni or Oppizoni (15 April 1769  – 13 April 1855), was a Roman Catholic cardinal and archbishop.

Biography
Oppizoni was born in Milan to an aristocratic family; he was the son of Count Francesco Oppizoni and Marchesa Paola Trivulzio. In 1790, he earned a doctorate in theology and canon law at the University of Pavia. In 1793, he was ordained as priest, and in 1799 became a leader of the Chapter of Canons of the Cathedral of Milan.

In 1802, he was named archbishop of Bologna. In 1804 Pope Pius VII raised him to the rank of cardinal. Napoleon named him senator in his arranged Kingdom of Italy, and member of the Order of the Iron Crown. However, he attempted to resist some of the political maneuvers of Napoleon and in 1808 tried to restore the rights to the church, and refused to attend the wedding of Napoleon with Marie Louise Habsburg in 1810; this caused the Napoleonic authorities to jail him in the Castle of Vincennes. He returned to Bologna in 1815.

He would fulfill a number of roles in the subsequent papal administrations, mostly while residing in Bologna, including as Archchancellor of the Pontifical University of Bologna. He was a papal legate to various provinces. He participated in four conclaves:

Conclave of 1823, electing Pope Leo XII
Conclave of 1829, electing Pope Pius VIII
Conclave of 1830-1831, electing Pope Gregory XVI
Conclave of 1846, electing Pope Pius IX

References

1769 births
1855 deaths
Clergy from Milan
19th-century Italian cardinals
Cardinals created by Pope Pius VII